The 2012 GP2 Series season was the forty-sixth season of the second-tier of Formula One feeder championship and also eighth season under the GP2 Series moniker and also the first season after merging with the GP2 Asia Series. The championship was expanded to include rounds in Malaysia, Bahrain and Singapore, in support of the 2012 Formula One season.

The series adopted the points system used by Formula One for the feature race, with points awarded to the top ten drivers and twenty-five points on offer for victory. The points awarded in the sprint race were also changed, with the winner receiving fifteen points and top eight drivers receiving points. Further changes mean that drivers must use two compounds of tyres over a race weekend, as is the case in Formula One. The points awarded for pole position and the fastest lap of the race were doubled as well.

The title was won by Italian Davide Valsecchi, driving for DAMS. After leading in the championship after winning sprint race in Silverstone, Luiz Razia ultimately got to second in the championship after score four victories. Esteban Gutierrez came third with 3 victories and finished just ahead of Max Chilton, who had 2 wins.

Teams and drivers

Team changes
 Carlin Motorsport entered into a partnership with Russian car manufacturer Marussia Motors and Formula One team Marussia F1, forming a similar relationship to their alliance with GP3 Series team Manor Racing.
 After competing as Lotus ART in 2011, ART Grand Prix was renamed as Lotus Grand Prix in both the GP2 and GP3 Series championships, reflecting their increased relationship with title sponsor Lotus Cars. The cars will carry a black and gold livery modelled on the livery used by parent team Lotus F1.
 Team Lazarus replaced Super Nova Racing, using the name "Venezuela GP Lazarus".

Driver changes
 Changed teams
 Ocean Racing Technology's Johnny Cecotto Jr. and Arden International's Josef Král both joined Barwa Addax Team.
 Stefano Coletti switched from Trident Racing to Scuderia Coloni, having driven for the team in the 2011 GP2 Final.
 After competing with Trident, Rodolfo González moved to Caterham.
 Fabio Leimer left Rapax to join Racing Engineering.
 Julián Leal moved from Rapax to Trident Racing, having competed for Trident at the 2011 GP2 Final in Abu Dhabi.
 Jolyon Palmer switched from Arden International to iSport International.
 Luiz Razia and Davide Valsecchi both moved from Caterham Team AirAsia to Arden International and DAMS respectively.
 Giedo van der Garde switched from teams' champions Barwa Addax Team to Caterham Racing; he also joined parent team Caterham F1 as test and reserve driver.

 Entering/Re-entering GP2 Series
 French driver Nathanaël Berthon, who finished 13th in the Formula Renault 3.5 Series, joined Racing Engineering.
 After finishing runner-up in the GP3 Series with Lotus ART, British driver James Calado joined the Lotus ART GP2 squadron, replacing Jules Bianchi.
 After competing at three rounds in 2010 with David Price Racing, Fabrizio Crestani returned to the series with Venezuela GP Lazarus, the team for which he competed in Auto GP.
 Tom Dillmann, who finished 14th in the GP3 Series, joined Rapax. Dillmann competed for iSport at the 2011 GP2 Final in Abu Dhabi.
 Rio Haryanto, who finished seventh in both the GP3 Series and Auto GP in 2011, joined Marussia Carlin. Haryanto competed for DAMS at the 2011 GP2 Final in Abu Dhabi.
 Auto GP race winner Jon Lancaster signed with Ocean Racing Technology.
 Dutch driver Nigel Melker, who finished third in the GP3 Series, joined Ocean Racing Technology. Melker had previously competed in the 2011 GP2 Final with DAMS.
 British Formula 3 champion Felipe Nasr joined DAMS for 2012.
 Italian Fabio Onidi, who finished fifth in Auto GP, signed with Scuderia Coloni. He competed in the 2011 GP2 Final with Super Nova Racing.
 Venezuelan Giancarlo Serenelli, a three-time LATAM Challenge Series champion, joined Venezuela GP Lazarus.
 Ricardo Teixeira, who competed in GP2 in 2009 with Trident Racing, returned to the series with Rapax.
 After competing for MW Arden in the GP3 Series, Swiss driver Simon Trummer joined Arden's GP2 team for 2012.

 Leaving GP2
 Part-time Carlin driver and 2010 Formula Renault 3.5 Series champion Mikhail Aleshin returned to Formula Renault 3.5 with Team RFR.
 After competing in two seasons with ART Grand Prix, Jules Bianchi moved to the Formula Renault 3.5 Series with Tech 1 Racing whilst serving as Force India's third driver for the 2012 Formula One season.
 Sam Bird, who drove for iSport in 2011, also switched to the Formula Renault 3.5 Series, joining the ISR team.
 After a partial campaign for Scuderia Coloni, Kevin Ceccon left the GP2 Series to debut in the GP3 Series with Ocean Racing Technology.
 Reigning champion Romain Grosjean returned to Formula One with Lotus.
 Álvaro Parente, who competed for Racing Engineering and Carlin Motorsport in 2011, joined the GT World Championship, driving for Hexis Racing.
 Barwa Addax driver Charles Pic moved into Formula One, signing a contract with Marussia F1.
 DAMS driver Pål Varhaug left the championship to compete in the 2012 Auto GP World Series.
 Two-time 2011 race-winner Christian Vietoris elected to concentrate on his DTM programme, joining the junior Mercedes scheme, earning a place in the HWA Team.

Mid-season changes
 René Binder replaced Giancarlo Serenelli in the Lazarus team for the tenth round of the championship, held at Spa-Francorchamps.
 Sergio Canamasas replaced Venezuela GP Lazarus' Fabrizio Crestani for the Hockenheim round of the championship.
 Dani Clos replaced Josef Král at the Barwa Addax Team for the Bahrain rounds of the championship. No explanation was given for the replacement. Král returned to the seat in Montmeló after Clos drove for HRT F1 in the first practice session of the Grand Prix; under the rules of the GP2 Series, no driver who takes part in a Grand Prix weekend is permitted to drive in the event's GP2 support races.
 In the week before the penultimate round of the championship at Monza, Scuderia Coloni announced that Stefano Coletti would be leaving the team with immediate effect as "season objectives" had not been met. Luca Filippi, who drove for the team when finished runner-up in 2011, was announced as Coletti's replacement. Coletti later joined Rapax, replacing Daniël de Jong.
 Brendon Hartley replaced Jon Lancaster at Ocean Racing Technology for the Bahrain rounds of the championship, for budgetary reasons. For the Catalunya round of the championship, Hartley was replaced by Victor Guerin.
 Daniël de Jong joined Rapax for the Valencia round after regular driver Ricardo Teixeira was taken ill. Tom Dillmann was moved to Teixeira's car to represent Teixeira's sponsors, while de Jong drove Dillmann's vacated car. Teixeira returned to his car for the Silverstone round, with de Jong replacing Dillmann; Dillmann rejoined the team in his original car for Hockenheim, before sitting out the remainder of the season.
 Jake Rosenzweig replaced Josef Král at the Barwa Addax Team for the penultimate round of the season at Monza.

2012 schedule
The calendar for the 2012 series was unveiled on 16 December 2011. The calendar was expanded to twelve rounds, featuring new races in Malaysia, Singapore, and Bahrain. The championship featured twenty-four races, a record high for the series.

Calendar changes
 The series travelled to Malaysia in support of the 2012 Malaysian Grand Prix. The GP2 Asia Series had previously visited the circuit during the 2008–09 season.
 The series also supported the 2012 Bahrain Grand Prix on the weekend of 22 April, with an independent round of the championship also taking place at the circuit during the following week.
 The series travelled to Singapore for the first time in its history, supporting the 2012 Singapore Grand Prix.
 The round at Istanbul Park was removed from the calendar after the Turkish Grand Prix was discontinued.
 The round at Yas Marina Circuit was also discontinued.
 The venue hosting the round in Germany followed the German Grand Prix from the Nürburgring to Hockenheim.

Results

Championship standings
Scoring system
Points were awarded to the top 10 classified finishers in the Feature race, and to the top 8 classified finishers in the Sprint race. The pole-sitter in the feature race also received four points, and two points were given to the driver who set the fastest lap inside the top ten in both the feature and sprint races. No extra points were awarded to the pole-sitter in the sprint race.

Feature race points

Sprint race points
Points were awarded to the top 8 classified finishers.

Drivers' Championship

Notes:
† — Drivers did not finish the race, but were classified as they completed over 90% of the race distance.

Teams' Championship

Notes:
† — Drivers did not finish the race, but were classified as they completed over 90% of the race distance.

Notes

References

External links
 GP2 Series official website

GP2 Series
GP2 Series seasons
GP2 Series